The Sheberghan Prison is a prison in northern Afghanistan.
Following the battle of Qali-Jangi, in Mazari Sharif, General Dostum sent many of the surviving captives to Sheberghan Prison.

He is reported to have sent them in industrial shipping containers,
in conditions said to have been  extremely crowded, with many of the captives dying in transit.  When the prisoners complained that they were suffocating, General Dostum's troops allegedly fired directly into the containers, killing some men, but providing limited ventilation for the others.

In 2009 the BBC News reported that new United States President Barack Obama had committed his administration to look into the claims about atrocities at Sherberghan.

See also 
 List of prisons in Afghanistan

References

Internees at the Sheberghan Prison